Headtrip is the second album by rock band Slapshock, released in 2001.

It was certified platinum in the Philippines.

Track listing 
All songs written by Jamir Garcia, Music By Slapshock

Personnel 
Vladimir Garcia – vocals
Lee Nadela - bass
Leandro Ansing - guitar
Jerry Basco - guitar
Richard Evora – drums

Additional Musician
Myra Ruaro – vocals, guest appearance on "My Skar"
Freq Foundation - Slap Vs Freak Remix
Francis Guevarra - Sick Curtain Remix

Album Credits 
Executive Producer: Chito R. Ilacad
Supervising Producer: Francis Guevarra
Sound Engineer: Angee Rozul
Album Cover & Layout Design: Rom Villaseran
Additional Live Photos: Ayan Tolentino, Jim Ayson
A&R: Mally Paraguya

References 

Slapshock albums
2001 albums